The 1938 college football season ended with the Horned Frogs of Texas Christian University (TCU) being named the nation's No. 1 team by 55 of the 77 voters in the final Associated Press writers' poll in early December. Tennessee was also chosen by six contemporary math system selectors as a national champion; both teams won every game. Notre Dame was chosen by the Dickinson System and won the Knute Rockne Memorial Trophy.

Conference and program changes

Conference changes
Two conferences began play during 1938:
 Alabama Intercollegiate Conference – active through the 1959 season
 Mountain States Conference – an NCAA University Division conference active through the 1961 season; also known as the Big Seven and Skyline Conference
One conference changed its name in 1938:
 The Tri-Normal League changed its name to the Washington Intercollegiate Conference

Membership changes

September
September 24 Defending champion Pittsburgh beat West Virginia, 19–0.  California defeated St. Mary's 12–7.  In Los Angeles, Alabama beat USC 19–7.  Minnesota defeated Washington 15–0, and Dartmouth beat Bates 46–0.

October
October 1 Alabama defeated Samford 34–0,  Fordham beat Upsala 47–0, Dartmouth beat St Lawrence 51–0, and Notre Dame beat Kansas 52–0.  Pitt defeated Temple 28–6, California beat Washington State 27–3, and Minnesota beat Nebraska 16–7.

October 8 Minnesota defeated Purdue 7–0.  Alabama beat North Carolina State 14–0.  Dartmouth stayed unscored upon, winning at Princeton 22–0.  Pittsburgh beat cross-town rival Duquesne 27–0.  Fordham beat Waynesburg College 53–0.  California played a double-header for the fans, with the reserves beating the California Agricultural school (lager UC-Davis) 48–0, and the varsity and reserves beating College of the Pacific 39–0.  In Atlanta, Notre Dame beat Georgia Tech 14–6.

October 15 Pittsburgh won at Wisconsin 26–6.  California defeated UCLA 20–7.  Dartmouth beat Brown 34–13, and Notre Dame beat Illinois 14–6.  Minnesota edged Michigan, 7–6.  Fordham was tied by Purdue 6–6, and in Birmingham, Alabama was shut out by Tennessee, 13–0.  When the first round of balloting was finished, the defending champion Panthers were again No. 1, followed by Minnesota, California, Dartmouth, and Notre Dame.

October 22 No. 1 Pittsburgh beat SMU 34–7.  No. 2 Minnesota was idle.  No. 3 California won at Seattle over Washington 14–7.  No. 4 Dartmouth won at Harvard 13–7.  No. 5 Notre Dame beat No. 13 Carnegie Tech 7–0.  No. 6 Santa Clara beat Arkansas 21–6 in San Francisco, while in Milwaukee, No. 7 TCU beat Marquette 21–0, and the two winners replaced Dartmouth and Notre Dame in the Top Five: No. 1 Pittsburgh, No. 2 Minnesota, No. 3 California, No. 4 TCU, and No. 5 Santa Clara.

October 29 
No. 1 Pittsburgh beat No. 9 Fordham, 24–13.  No. 2 Minnesota fell to No. 12 Northwestern, 6–3.  No. 3 California beat Oregon State 13–7.  No. 4 TCU beat Baylor 39–7, and No. 5 Santa Clara won at Michigan State 7–6.  No. 6 Dartmouth won at Yale 24–6 and No. 7 Notre Dame beat Army in Yankee Stadium, 19–7, and both returned to the Top Five: No. 1 Pittsburgh, No. 2 TCU, No. 3 California, No. 4 Notre Dame, and No. 5 Dartmouth.

November
November 5 In Pittsburgh, the No. 1 Panthers lost to No. 19 Carnegie Tech, 20–10.  No. 2 TCU won at Tulsa 21–0.  No. 3 California lost at No. 13 USC 13–7.  In Baltimore, No. 4 Notre Dame beat Navy 15–0.  No. 5 Dartmouth beat Dickinson College, 44–6.  No. 6 Tennessee beat Chattanooga 45–0 to extend its record to 7–0–0.  The Horned Frogs of TCU leaped into the top spot, ahead of Notre Dame, Pittsburgh, Tennessee, and Dartmouth.

November 12 No. 1 TCU beat Texas 28–6.  No. 2 Notre Dame beat No. 12 Minnesota 19–0.  No. 3 Pittsburgh beat Nebraska 19–0.  No. 4 Tennessee won at Vanderbilt 14–0.  No. 5 Dartmouth lost at No. 20 Cornell 14–7.  No. 7 Duke remained unbeaten (7–0–0), untied, and unscored upon with a 21–0 win at Syracuse.  In the next poll, the Irish moved up to the top rung, followed by TCU, Tennessee, Duke, and Pittsburgh.

November 19 No. 1 Notre Dame won at No. 16 Northwestern 9–7.  No. 2 TCU won at Rice 29–7.  No. 3 Tennessee was idle as it prepared for a holiday game.  No. 4 Duke beat N.C. State, 7–0. No. 5 Pittsburgh beat Penn State 26–0.  The rankings shuffled to No. 1 Notre Dame, No. 2 TCU, No. 3 Duke, No. 4 Pittsburgh, and No. 5 Tennessee.

On Thanksgiving Day No. 5 Tennessee beat Kentucky 46–0, while No. 6 Oklahoma beat Oklahoma A&M 19-0.  Two days later, November 26, No. 1 Notre Dame remained idle.  No. 2 TCU beat SMU in Dallas, 20–7.  No. 3 Duke and 
No. 4 Pittsburgh met at Durham, with the hosts winning 7–0.  With a record of 9–0–0, Duke had outscored its opponents 114–0, but stayed in third in the next set of rankings. On November 29 the "final" AP Poll was released with Notre Dame No. 1, followed by No. 2 TCU, No. 3 Duke, No. 4 Tennessee, and No. 5 Oklahoma.

On December 3, No. 1 Notre Dame lost in Los Angeles to No. 8 USC, 13–0. As a result the AP Poll was extended for another week. On December 6 previously No. 2-ranked TCU received 55 first place votes in the second final poll and accepted a bid to the Sugar Bowl.  No. 4 Tennessee beat Ole Miss 47–0 in Memphis, and moved up to second place.  Though the SEC champion would be Sugar Bowl bound in later years, a No. 1 vs. No. 2 match was not to be had, as Tennessee instead took a bid for the Orange Bowl.  No. 3 Duke stayed in third place, despite having never been scored upon in 1938, and accepted an invitation to the Rose Bowl.  No. 5 Oklahoma beat Washington State 28–0 and moved up to fourth place. Both unbeaten and untied at 10–0–0, Tennessee and Oklahoma would meet in Miami, but the title had been awarded to 10–0–0 TCU. Notre Dame fell to fifth place.

Conference standings

Major conference standings

Independents

Minor conferences

Minor conference standings

Rankings

Heisman Trophy voting
The Heisman Trophy is given to the year's most outstanding player

Bowl games

See also
 1938 College Football All-America Team

References